Gaston Jean-Paul Pieddeloup (28 October 1921 – 14 December 2009) was a French rower. He competed in the men's coxed four event at the 1948 Summer Olympics.

References

1921 births
2009 deaths
French male rowers
Olympic rowers of France
Rowers at the 1948 Summer Olympics